Andrei Răzvan Dima (born 8 February 2006) is a Romanian professional footballer who plays as an attacking midfielder for Liga I side Rapid București.

References

External links
 
 Andrei Dima at prosportbucuresti.ro

2006 births
Living people
Footballers from Bucharest
Romanian footballers
Association football midfielders
Liga I players
Liga III players
LPS HD Clinceni players